Debercsény is a village and municipality in the comitat of Nógrád, Hungary.

Etymology
The name probably comes from Slavic/Slovak Debrečany (older etymologies were Dobročany, Dobročín, Dobrčín).  Old Slavic deber, debra - a valley, a ravine, a pothole. Similar place names can be found in Eastern Slovakia (see e.g. Debraď) where the word has been preserved in dialects until the modern times.

References

Populated places in Nógrád County